This list is of the Intangible Cultural Properties of Japan in the Prefecture of Tokushima.

National Cultural Properties
As of 1 February 2015, zero Important Intangible Cultural Properties have been designated.

Prefectural Cultural Properties
As of 12 February 2015, six properties have been designated at a prefectural level.

Municipal Cultural Properties
As of 1 May 2014, five properties have been designated at a municipal level, including:

See also
 Cultural Properties of Japan
 Awa Odori

References

External links
  Cultural Properties in Tokushima Prefecture

Culture in Tokushima Prefecture
Tokushima